Fernando García del Molino (23 March 1813, Santiago - 1899, Buenos Aires) was a Chilean-born Argentine portrait painter, miniaturist and lithographer. Many of his portraits were done from photographs or daguerrotypes.

Biography 
He was born to a family of Spanish merchants. In 1822, when he was only nine, they moved to Buenos Aires. Shortly after, he began to show some artistic talent and was enrolled in classes at the "Academy of Drawing" of the University of Buenos Aires, where he studied with the Italian painter, Pablo Caccianiga (1798-1862). While there, he befriended his fellow student Carlos Morel and they often painted together. After graduating, he turned to teaching. One of his earliest students was Franklin Rawson, only six years his junior. He was already a well-known artist by the age of twenty-five.

During the Juan Manuel de Rosas administration, he created most of his best-known portraits, including those of Manuela Rosas, Encarnación Ezcurra, Rosas himself and many more of those in his immediate circle. He visited Rosas' home in the Palermo District so often, that he virtually became the Governor's official painter.

He also created portraits of notable figures from Argentine history, including Facundo Quiroga and José Félix Aldao. After Rosas went into exile, his commissions decreased dramatically. Later, he took a trip to London; invited by Manuela Rosas and her husband, Máximo Terrero (1817-1898), the son of rancher and businessman . While there, he painted another portrait of the elderly Rosas, probably in Southampton.

References

Further reading
 José León Pagano, Fernando García del Molino: El pintor de la Federación, Secretaría de Educación, Subsecretaría de Cultura, 1948

External links 

 ArtNet: Miniatures by García del Molino
 "Fernando García del Molino, el pintor de Rosas"; a review of the exhibition "Retratos para una identidad. Fernando García del Molino, 1813- 1899", by Mercedes Perez Bergliaffa @ Revista de Cultura.

1813 births
1899 deaths
Portrait painters
Miniature painting
University of Buenos Aires alumni
Juan Manuel de Rosas
19th-century Argentine painters
19th-century Argentine male artists
Argentine male painters
Artists from Santiago
Artists from Buenos Aires